The Agreement on Strategic Partnership and Mutual Support between Azerbaijan and Turkey for strategic partnership and security co-operation was signed at Baku by Presidents Ilham Aliyev and Abdullah Gül.

Under the terms of the treaty, both Turkey and Azerbaijan will support each other "using all possibilities" in the case of a military attack or aggression against either of the countries.

Overview
The Agreement consists of 23 articles and five chapters: "Military-political and security issues", "Military and military-technical cooperation", "Humanitarian issues", "Economic cooperation", and "Common and final provisions".

History

Ratification process

Azerbaijan
The agreement was ratified by National Assembly of Azerbaijan on 21 December 2010.

Turkey
Following ratification by the Azerbaijani Assembly, Grand National Assembly of Turkey ratified on 2 February 2011.

See also
Azerbaijan–Turkey relations

References

Treaties of Turkey
Treaties of Azerbaijan
Treaties entered into force in 2011
Treaties concluded in 2010
21st-century military alliances
Military alliances involving Azerbaijan
Military alliances involving Turkey
Azerbaijan–Turkey relations
2010 in Turkey
2010 in Azerbaijan